Events from the year 1877 in the United States.

Incumbents

Federal Government 
 President: Ulysses S. Grant (R-Ohio) (until March 4), Rutherford B. Hayes (R-Ohio) (starting March 4)
 Vice President: vacant (until March 4), William A. Wheeler (R-New York) (starting March 4)
 Chief Justice: Morrison Waite (Ohio)
 Speaker of the House of Representatives: Samuel J. Randall (D-Pennsylvania)
 Congress: 44th (until March 4), 45th (starting March 4)

Events

January–March

 January 8 – Indian Wars – Battle of Wolf Mountain: Crazy Horse and his warriors fight their last battle with the United States Cavalry in Montana.
 February 28 – Indian Wars – Agreement of 1877 (19 Stat. 254): Congress annexes Sioux Indian land, including the Black Hills.
 March 2 – In the Compromise of 1877, the U.S. presidential election, 1876 is resolved with the selection of Rutherford B. Hayes as the winner, even though Samuel J. Tilden had won the popular vote on November 7, 1876.
 March 4 – Rutherford B. Hayes was sworn in as the 19th President of the United States, and William A. Wheeler sworn in as Vice President of the United States.
 March 13 – Chester Greenwood patents earmuffs.

April–June
 April 15 – First telephone line installed between Boston and Somerville, Massachusetts.
 May 5 – Indian Wars: Sitting Bull leads his band of Lakota into Canada to avoid harassment by the United States Army under Colonel Nelson Miles.
 May 6 – Realizing that his people are weakened by cold and hunger, Chief Crazy Horse of the Oglala Sioux surrenders to United States troops in Nebraska.
 May 8 – At Gilmore's Gardens in New York City, the first Westminster Kennel Club Dog Show opens (ends May 11).
 June 15 – Henry Russian Flipper becomes the first African American cadet to graduate from the United States Military Academy.
 June 17 – Indian Wars – Battle of White Bird Canyon: The Nez Perce defeat the U.S. Cavalry at White Bird Canyon in the Idaho Territory.
 June 21 – The Molly Maguires are hanged at Carbon County Prison in Jim Thorpe, Pennsylvania.

July–September
 July 10 – The then villa of Mayagüez, Puerto Rico formally receives its city charter from the Royal Crown of Spain.
 July 16 – Great Railroad Strike of 1877: Riots by Baltimore and Ohio Railroad railroad workers in Baltimore, Maryland lead to a sympathy strike in Pittsburgh, and a worker's rebellion in St. Louis before U.S. President Rutherford B. Hayes calls in the armed forces.
 August 9 – Indian Wars – Battle of Big Hole: Near Big Hole River in Montana, a small band of Nez Percé Indians who refused government orders to move to a reservation, clash with the United States Army. The army loses 29 soldiers and Indians lose 89 warriors in a U.S. Army victory.
 August 17 – Arizona blacksmith F.P. Cahill is fatally wounded by Billy the Kid. Cahill dies the next day, becoming the first person killed by the Kid.
 September – The first meeting of the Knights of Reliance in Lampasas County, Texas, which morphed into the Farmers' Alliance and eventually became the Populist Party.
 September 5 – Indian Wars: Oglala Sioux chief Crazy Horse is bayoneted by a United States soldier, after resisting confinement in a guardhouse at Fort Robinson in Nebraska.

October–December
 October 10 – Following the recovery of Lieutenant-Colonel George Armstrong Custer's body from where he fell during the Battle of Little Big Horn the previous year, Custer is given a funeral with full military honors and is laid to rest at the United States Military Academy at West Point, New York.
 November 21 – Thomas Edison announces his invention of the phonograph, a machine that can record sound, considered Edison's first great invention. Edison demonstrates the device for the first time on November 29.
 November 22 – The first college lacrosse game is played between New York University and Manhattan College.
 December 6 – The Washington Post newspaper first published in D.C.

Ongoing
 Reconstruction era (1865–1877)
 Gilded Age (1869–c. 1896)
 Depression of 1873–79 (1873–1879)

Sport 
September 29 – Boston Red Caps win their First National League Championship

Births
 March 7 – Charles O. Andrews, U.S. Senator from Florida from 1936 to 1946 (died 1946)
 March 9 – Albert Leo Stevens, balloonist (died 1944)
 March 16 – Thomas Wyatt Turner, civil rights activist, biologist and educator; first black person ever to receive a doctorate from Cornell (died 1978)
 April 3 – Karl C. Schuyler, U.S. Senator from Colorado from 1932 to 1933 (died 1933)
 April 23 – Charles D. Herron, United States Army general (died 1977)
 May 16 – Joseph M. McCormick, U.S. Senator from Illinois from 1919 to 1925 (died 1925)
 May 23 – Grace Ingalls, youngest sister of author Laura Ingalls Wilder (died 1941)
 May 26 (probable date) – Isadora Duncan, dancer (died 1927 in France)
 June 12 – Thomas C. Hart, U.S. Senator from Connecticut from 1945 to 1946 (died 1971)
 July 1 – Benjamin O. Davis Sr., US Army General. First African-American to rise to the rank of Brigadier General. (died 1970)
 July 2 – Rinaldo Cuneo, artist, "the painter of San Francisco" (died 1939)
 August 10 – Frank Marshall, chess player (died 1944)
 August 15 – Stanley Vestal, historian of the Old West and poet (died 1957)
 August 27 – Lloyd C. Douglas, novelist and pastor (died 1951)
 September 6 – Buddy Bolden, African American jazz cornetist (died 1930)
 October 2 – Carl Hayden, U.S. Senator from Arizona from 1927 to 1969 (died 1972)
 October 13 – Theodore G. Bilbo, Governor of Mississippi from 1928 to 1932 and from 1935 to 1947 and U.S. Senator from Mississippi from 1935 to 1947 (died 1947)
 October 31 – Josiah O. Wolcott, U.S. Senator from Delaware from 1917 to 1921 (died 1938)
 November 12 – Warren Austin, U.S. Senator from Vermont from 1931 to 1946 (died 1962)
 November 16 – Rice W. Means, U.S. Senator from Colorado from 1924 to 1927 (died 1949)
 November 24
 Alben W. Barkley, 35th Vice President of the United States from 1949 to 1953 and U.S. Senator from Kentucky from 1927 to 1949 and from 1955 to 1956 (died 1956)
 Edward C. Kalbfus, admiral (died 1954)

Deaths
 January 3 – John Joseph Abercrombie, Union Army brigadier general (born 1798)
 January 4 – Cornelius Vanderbilt, entrepreneur (born 1794)
 January 17 – John Pettit, U.S. Senator from Indiana from 1853 to 1855 (born 1807)
 June 17 – Daniel D. Pratt, U.S. Senator from Indiana from 1869 to 1875 (born 1813)
 July 16 – Samuel McLean, congressman from Montana (born 1826)
 August 28 – Ben DeBar, American actor-manager (born 1812)
 August 29 – Brigham Young, Mormon leader (born 1801)
 August 30 – Raphael Semmes, officer in the Confederate navy during the American Civil War (born 1809)
 September 5 – Crazy Horse, Oglala Lakota chief (born 1840-45)
 September 20 – Lewis V. Bogy, U.S. Senator from Missouri from 1873 to 1877 (born 1813)
 October 29 – Nathan Bedford Forrest, Confederate Civil War General, first Grand Wizard of the Ku Klux Klan (born 1821)
 November 1 – Oliver P. Morton, U.S. Senator from Indiana from 1867 to 1877 (born 1823

See also
Timeline of United States history (1860–1899)

References

External links
 

 
1870s in the United States
United States
United States
Years of the 19th century in the United States